Mihăilă is a Romanian surname. Notable people with the surname include:

Ioana Mihăilă (born 1980), Romanian politician and endocrinologist
Narcis Mihăilă (born 1987), Romanian racewalker
Valentin Mihăilă (born 2000), Romanian footballer

Romanian-language surnames